In mathematics, the binomial differential equation is an ordinary differential equation containing one or more functions of one independent variable and the derivatives of those functions.

For example:

The Solution 
Let  be a polynomial in two variables of order ; where  is a positive integer. The binomial differential equation becomes
 using the substitution , we get that , therefore
 or we can write , which is a separable ordinary differential equation, hence 

Special cases:

 
- If , i.e.,  divides  so that there is a positive integer  such that , then the solution has the form . From the tables book of Gradshteyn and Ryzhik we found that 

and

See also 
Examples of differential equations

References 

 Zwillinger, Daniel Handbook of Differential Equations, 3rd ed. Boston, MA: Academic Press, p. 120, 1997.

Differential calculus
Ordinary differential equations